Tirana District was one of the 36 districts of Albania, which were dissolved in July 2000 and replaced by 12 newly created counties. Its territory is now part of Tirana County: the municipalities of Tirana, Kamëz and Vorë.

Administrative divisions

The district consisted of the following municipalities:

Baldushk
Bërxullë
Bërzhitë
Dajt
Farkë
Kamëz
Kashar
Krrabë
Ndroq
Paskuqan
Petrelë
Pezë
Prezë
Shëngjergj
Tirana
Vaqarr
Vorë
Zall-Bastar
Zall-Herr

See also
Villages of Tirana County

References

External links
 Regional Council of Tirana County

Districts of Albania
Geography of Tirana County